The Diocese of Srijem (Latin: Dioecesis Sirmiensis) is Latin Church ecclesiastical territory or diocese of the Catholic Church in Serbia. It is a suffragan diocese in the ecclesiastical province of the Archdiocese of Đakovo-Osijek. The episcopal see of the diocese is in Sremska Mitrovica.

Territory
It includes Serbian part of the region of Syrmia, which is administratively divided between the Autonomous Province of Vojvodina and the City of Belgrade.

The diocese includes adherents mainly from Croat and Hungarian ethnic communities.

History
Diocese of Syrmia was created upon the request of Ugrin Csák, Archbishop of Kalocsa in 1229. It became a suffragan bishopric of the Hungarian church administration.

In 1521, after the fall of Belgrade, the region of Syrmia was overrun by Ottoman Turks. The Latin Church continued to appoint bishops for Syrmia, but they were living mainly outside their diocese. During the Austro-Turkish wars of (1683–1699) and (1716–1718), entire region of Syrmia was liberated from Turkish rule and incorporated into the Habsburg monarchy. In 1773, the Diocese of Syrmia and Diocese of Bosnia and Đakovo were joined into a single enlarged diocese that was named the Diocese of Bosnia-Đakovo and Syrmia.

In 1918, the region was incorporated into newly formed Kingdom of Serbs, Croats and Slovenes, known as Yugoslavia. In 1945, region of Syrmia became part of Serbia within Yugoslavia. In 1963, name of the diocese was changed to Diocese of Đakovo or Bosnia and Srijem. After the breakup of Yugoslavia (1991–1992) there were several initiatives towards the renewal of the separate Diocese of Srijem.

On 15 July 1999 the Holy See created the territory with a special authority to govern the Serbian part of the Diocese of Djakovo or Bosna and Srijem and on 1 October 1999 was established as a General Vicariate for Srijem with the residence in Petrovaradin.

On 18 June 2008 the Diocese of Đakovo or Bosnia and Srijem was divided into two administrative units: the Archdiocese of Đakovo-Osijek and the Diocese of Srijem. The current bishop is Đuro Gašparović, appointed in 2008. Previously he had been the auxiliary bishop of the parent diocese.

Bishops
This is incomplete list of Roman Catholic Bishops of Syrmia:
 Innocent (1232)
 Oliver (1250–1262)
 John (1262–1269)
 Pouka (1277–1293)
 Nicholas (1299–1300)
 Vincent (?–1306)
 Petar (around 1374)
 Konrad Schnosputger, O.S.A. (26 Jul 1433 – 1436, Died)
 Giacomo Piceno, O.F.M. (1454–1459, Died)
 Orbán (22 Apr 1460–1465 Died)
 Miklós Báthori (8 Jan 1473 – 22 Apr 1474, Appointed Bishop of Vác)
 Zsigmond Palóczy (5 Apr 1475 – 1479, Died)
 Boldizsár (25 Jun 1479 – 1481, Died)
 János Vitéz (31 Mar 1482 – 3 Jun 1489, Appointed Bishop of Veszprém)
 Stjepan Crispo (26 Feb 1490 – )
 Mikuláš Csáky (de Bačka) (29 Apr 1499 – 5 Jun 1501, Appointed Bishop of Nitra)
 Gabril Polgar (30 May 1502 – )
 István de Szatmar (2 Sep 1502 – 1505 Died)
 János Ország de Guth ( 1505–1520, Appointed Bishop of Vác)
 László de Macedonia (Dec 1520–1526, Resigned)
 Stjepan Brodarić (11 Mar 1526 – 30 May 1539, Appointed Bishop of Vác)
 Márton Pethe de Hetes (1582 – 26 Oct 1583, Appointed Bishop of Vác)
 Štefan da Trnava, O.S.P.P.E. (20 Mar 1589 – 1592, Died)
 Miklós Zelniczey Naprady (1593 – 17 Jun 1596, Appointed Bishop of Pécs)
 Šimun Bratulić, O.S.P.P.E. (15 Jan 1601 – 13 Sep 1604, Appointed Bishop of Zagreb)
 László Majthényi (18 May 1616 – 1624, Died)
 Francesco Jany (1 Jul 1697 – Apr 1702, Died)
 Joseph Antoine Marie Favini, O.F.M. Conv. (14 May 1703 – 22 Nov 1717, Died)
 Franjo Vernić (22 Nov 1717 – 27 Jun 1729, Died)
 Gabriel Patačić (12 Feb 1731 – 28 Sep 1733, Appointed Archbishop of Kalocsa)
 Ladislav Szörényi (15 Feb 1734 – 13 Nov 1752, Died)
 Nicolò Givovich (13 Nov 1752 – 16 May 1762, Died)
 Ivan Krstitelj Paxy (20 Dec 1762 – 10 Sep 1770, Confirmed Bishop of Zagreb)

Diocese recreated in 2008:
 Đuro Gašparović (18 June 2008 – current)

 Coadjutor Bishop Fabijan Svalina (7 October 2021 – current)

See also
 Roman Catholicism in Serbia
 Syrmia

References

Another sources 
 Magyar katolikus lexikon I–XV. Főszerk. Diós István; szerk. Viczián János. Budapest: Szent István Társulat. 1993–2010., list of bishops:

External links
 http://www.catholic-hierarchy.org/diocese/dsrij.html

Srijem
Srijem
Syrmia
Sremska Mitrovica